Rezekne Academy of Technologies is an institution of higher education and scientific research in Rēzekne, Latvia. It is one of two Augstskola (literally 'high school,' cognate of Hochschule) based in Eastern Latvia.

History
A teacher's college was established in Rēzekne in 1922. The Popular Front of Latvia supported the principle of further higher education in Latgale in the 1980s. Classes based on the University of Latvia began in 1991 and the Rēzeknes Augstskola was established officially in 1993. The current name was adopted in 2016. The former name was rendered Rezekne Higher Education Institution in English.

Faculties

The Academy consists of three faculties:
 Faculty of Education, Languages, and Design
 Faculty of Engineering
 Faculty of Economics and Management

References

External links 
 Official site

Rēzekne
Universities and colleges in Latvia
1993 establishments in Latvia
Educational institutions established in 1993